Bamboula's Village was an attempt to recreate an Ivory Coast village within the Planète Sauvage zoo (then known as Safari Africain) in Port-Saint-Père, near Nantes, in France. It is considered  human zoo in France.

In 1994, the biscuit brand Biscuiterie Saint-Michel teamed up with the safari park to create the village, naming it "Bamboula's Village" after its "Bamboula" chocolate biscuits, which had a black mascot with the same name (a racial slur, dating from colonial times). The village was constructed in the winter of 1993.

Working conditions
25 Ivorians, including children, were hired for six months to build and inhabit the village. They performed every day of the week, and received pay below the French minimum wage. Dancers were forced to work bare-chested despite bad weather. Performers' passports were confiscated; most lived confined to their huts (the park gate being closed in the evenings), which provided less space than required by labour law. Children were kept out of school, while medical care was provided by the zoo's veterinarians.

Opposition
Anti-racist organisations and unions formed the group "Non à la réserve humaine" ["No to the Human Zoo"] and began legal action against the park. By the time that the court had sent an expert to document human-rights violations, the performers had been ordered out of the country. The village was closed in September of 1994. The park had to pay a symbolic one French franc (€0.15) in damages, plus legal fees.

Aftermath
Bamboula's Village was demolished, and the Bamboula chocolate biscuit was no longer sold.

References

1994 in France
Tourism in France
Zoos in France
Racism in France
Francophonie